The Junkie and the Juicehead Minus Me is the 48th album by country singer Johnny Cash, released in 1974 on Columbia Records. Although credited to Cash alone, the album includes solo performances by his daughter Rosanne Cash, and stepdaughters Rosie Nix Adams and Carlene Carter (credited as Carlene Routh), predating the launch of their own solo careers. Two songs on the album were written by Kris Kristofferson, while "Don't Take Your Guns to Town" is a re-recording of a highly successful Cash single, his first smash hit for Columbia from back in 1958. "Father and Daughter (Father and Son)" is a cover version of a well-known Cat Stevens song and a duet with Cash's stepdaughter, Rosie Nix Adams, with slight changes in lyrics; a version of the same song would be released in 2003 on Unearthed, as a duet with Fiona Apple. June Carter Cash also performs a solo track without her husband, one of only a couple of occasions where she did this on a Johnny Cash album outside of concert recordings.

Track listing

Note: Track 2 "Don't Take Your Guns to Town" is a re-recording, recorded 18 June 1974 at Sound Spectrum Recording, House of Cash, Hendersonville, TN.

Personnel
 Johnny Cash - vocals, guitar
 Bob Wootton, Carl Perkins, Jerry Hensley, David Jones, Randy Scruggs, Jerry Shook, Helen Carter, Jack Routh - guitar
 Marshall Grant, Ronnie Reno, Jimmy Tittle - bass
 WS Holland, DJ Fontana - drums
 Stu Basone - steel guitar
 Gordon Terry - fiddle
 Larry McCoy, Jerry Whitehurst - piano
 The Carter Family, Rosanne Cash, Carlene Routh, Rosey Nix, June Carter Cash - vocals
Additional personnel
Produced by Charlie Bragg and Johnny Cash
Cover photo: Marion Ward
Flyleaf photos: Marion Ward and Hope Powell
Album design: Bill Barnes and Peggy Owens

Charts
Album - Billboard (United States)

External links

Johnny Cash albums
1974 albums
Columbia Records albums